Glossispira is a genus of sea snails, marine gastropod mollusks in the family Pseudomelatomidae.

Species
Species within the genus Glossispira include:
 Glossispira harfordiana (Reeve, L.A., 1843): accepted as  Crassispira harfordiana (Reeve, L.A., 1843)

References

  McLean, J.H. (1971) A revised classification of the family Turridae, with the proposal of new subfamilies, genera, and subgenera from the Eastern Pacific. The Veliger, 14, 114–130

External links
 
 Bouchet, P.; Kantor, Y. I.; Sysoev, A.; Puillandre, N. (2011). A new operational classification of the Conoidea (Gastropoda). Journal of Molluscan Studies. 77(3): 273-308

Pseudomelatomidae
Gastropod genera